This is a collection of articles relating to Finland, a country in Northern Europe.

The main article 
Finland

Administrative regions 
Historical provinces of Finland
List of cities and towns in Finland
Helsinki
Mariehamn
Oulu
Tampere
Turku
Municipalities of Finland
Provinces of Finland
Eastern Finland
Lapland
Oulu
Southern Finland
Western Finland
Åland Islands (Autonomous region)
Regions of Finland

Communications 
Communications in Finland
Transportation in Finland
Finnair

Culture 

Architects
Alvar Aalto
Eero Saarinen
Eliel Saarinen
Artists
Akseli Gallen-Kallela
Albert Edelfelt
Helene Schjerfbeck
Hugo Simberg
Magnus Enckell
Composers
Leevi Madetoja
Oskar Merikanto
Einojuhani Rautavaara
Kaija Saariaho
Jean Sibelius
Conductors
Paavo Berglund
Esa-Pekka Salonen
Jukka-Pekka Saraste
Leif Segerstam
Sakari Oramo
Osmo Vänskä
Finnish cuisine
Kalakukko
Karelian pasties
Mustamakkara
Mämmi
Sahti
Filmmakers
Renny Harlin
Aki Kaurismäki
Flag flying days in Finland
Holidays in Finland
Kalevala
Elias Lönnrot
 Finnish national symbols
 National anthem of Finland
 Flag of Finland
 Coat of arms of Finland
Music of Finland
Kantele
Literature
Mythology
Namesdays in Finland
Opera singers
Karita Mattila
Poets
List of Finnish poets
Eino Leino
Johan Ludvig Runeberg
Edith Södergran
Sauna
Valtion elokuvatarkastamo (Finnish Board of Film Classification)
Writers
Väinö Linna
The Unknown Soldier (novel)
Frans Emil Sillanpää
Tove Jansson
Mika Waltari
The Egyptian
The Dark Angel

Demography and languages 

Finland's language strife
Finnish alphabet
Finnish grammar
Finns
Minorities
Swedish-speaking Finns
Finland Swedish
Swedish language
Roma
Romany language
Sami people
Sami languages
Islam in Finland

Economy 

Finland and Globalization
List of Finnish companies
Finnair
Nokia
Nordea
Stora Enso
UPM-Kymmene
YLE
List of Finnish newspapers
Suomen Pankki
Tourism in Finland

Education and science 

List of schools in Finland
List of polytechnics in Finland
List of universities in Finland
University of Helsinki
Aalto University
University of Eastern Finland
University of Jyväskylä
University of Lapland
University of Oulu
University of Tampere
University of Turku
University of Vaasa
Åbo Akademi University
Academy of Fine Arts
Lappeenranta University of Technology
Sibelius Academy 
Hanken School of Economics
Tampere University of Technology
The Theatre Academy 
Scientists
Johan Gadolin
Ragnar Granit
Ernst Leonard Lindelöf
Rolf Nevanlinna
Linus Torvalds
Edvard Westermarck
Artturi Ilmari Virtanen
Yrjö Väisälä
Georg Henrik von Wright
Arvo Ylppö

Environment 
Animals found only or typically in Finland
Flying squirrel
Norppa
National parks of Finland
Protected areas of Finland

Geography 

Eurasia
Europe
Hills and mountains
Haltitunturi
Islands
Hailuoto
Åland Islands
List of lakes in Finland
Inari
Päijänne
Saimaa
List of rivers of Finland
Salpausselkä
Scandinavia
Sea areas
Gulf of Bothnia
Gulf of Finland

History 

Finland's language strife
Fennoman
Finnish mythology
Finnish paganism
Foreign relations of Finland
Finno-Soviet Treaty of 1948
Finlandization
Paasikivi-Kekkonen Line
Historical figures
Mikael Agricola
Per Brahe the Younger
List of presidents of Finland
Carl Gustaf Emil Mannerheim
List of Finnish wars
Aunus expedition
Continuation War
Estonian Liberation War
Finnish Civil War
Lapland War
Viena expedition
Winter War

Lists 
List of Finnish politicians
List of Finnish provinces
List of Finnish municipalities
List of Finnish municipalities by population
List of Finnish municipalities by area
List of universities in Finland
List of Finnish newspapers
List of Finnish companies
List of Finnish wars
List of Finns
List of lakes in Finland
List of presidents of Finland
List of prime ministers of Finland

Politics 

Constitution of Finland
Elections in Finland
Finnish Defence Forces
Government of Finland
List of Finnish politicians
Parliament of Finland
President of Finland
Prime Minister of Finland

Religion 
Evangelical Lutheran Church of Finland
Finnish Orthodox Church
Notable clergymen
Mikael Agricola
Islam in Finland

Sport 

 Finnish Student Sports Federation

Athletes
Janne Ahonen
Sami Hyypiä
Mika Häkkinen
Heikki Kovalainen
Saku Koivu
Jari Kurri
Jari Litmanen
Paavo Nurmi
Matti Nykänen
Kimi Räikkönen
Teemu Selänne
Lasse Virén
Finland national football team
Finnish national men's ice hockey team
Finnish sports
Kyykkä
Nordic walking
Pesäpallo

Other pages 
Asbestos-Ceramic
Finnish International Baccalaureate Society
International rankings of Finland
Golden Triangle (Finland)
The Greatest Finns
Gun politics in Finland
Sisu

See also 

 Finnish (disambiguation)